Val Belmonte (born 1951 in Chicago, Illinois) is an American former ice hockey coach, player and executive. He has also served as a sports official and university athletics director. He played for the University of Illinois Chicago (UIC), followed by an 18-year college coaching career. His longest coaching stint was from 1982–1990 as the Head Coach of the UIC Flames, during which he won the 1987 CCHA Coach of the Year Award. Belmonte has written several books on the sport of hockey, including several manuals published by USA Hockey which serves as the National Governing body for the sport in the United States.

Career
After graduating from the now defunct Holy Cross High School in River Grove, Illinois, in 1969, Belmonte attended UIC, where he was member of the varsity team. Belmonte had a severe eye injury that ended his playing career He had eye reattachment surgery after he was checked into the boards of a new rink, that had a nail sticking out of the boards. After his graduation from UIC, Belmonte took up coaching. He was the head coach of Oak Park River Forest High School in 1974–75 which won the 1975 Amateur Hockey Association of Illinois State Varsity Championships (now known as "Blackhawk Cup").

Belmonte coached college hockey from 1975 to 1990 with the University of North Dakota, Harvard University and the University of Illinois-Chicago. He led the UIC Flames to six Central Collegiate Hockey Association playoff appearances as the head coach and was named CCHA Coach of the Year in 1986–87. Belmonte coached several players who played in the NHL, including Shawn Cronin, Ray Stazek, and long time minor league star Colin Chin.  Belmonte also coached Jeff Nelson, who went on to represent the United States in the World Cup of Inline hockey. As an assistant at Harvard University, he coached Hobey Baker Award winners Mark and Scott Fusco.

From 1991 until 2000, Belmonte was Director of Coaching at USA Hockey, Inc. in Colorado Springs. From 2000–2004, Belmonte took over as Athletic Director of Union College.  In his tenure, Union rebuilt many of their athletic facilities including a state of the art football field and field house. During his years at Union College, Belmonte served on the executive comm. for the ECAC, and was involving in the breaking away of the ECAC to form a subsidiary, the ECACHL.

After Union College, Belmonte was executive director of the United States Figure Skating Association for a year, before being named Vice President of Athletic Marketing and External Affairs Quinnipiac University in 2006. In 2009, Belmonte left Quinnipiac to become executive vice-president in the Chicago office of DHR International.

Head coaching record

Awards
 1987 – CCHA Coach of the Year Award
 2007 – Belmonte was inducted into the Illinois Hockey Hall of Fame.

References

External links

Living people
1951 births
American ice hockey coaches
Harvard Crimson men's ice hockey coaches
High school ice hockey coaches in the United States
North Dakota Fighting Hawks men's ice hockey coaches
UIC Flames men's ice hockey coaches
UIC Flames men's ice hockey players
Union Dutchmen and Dutchwomen athletic directors
Quinnipiac University people
Ice hockey people from Chicago
Ice hockey coaches from Illinois